Magdalena National Forest was established as the Magdalena Forest Reserve by the U.S. Forest Service in New Mexico on November 5, 1906, with .  It became a National Forest on March 4, 1907. On July 1, 1908, San Mateo National Forest was added. On February 23, 1909, the forest was combined with Datil National Forest

The Magdalena Forest is now part of the Magdalena Ranger District of Cibola National Forest, in the Magdalena Mountains to the south of Magdalena in Socorro County.

References

External links
Cibola National Forest, Magdalena Ranger District
Forest History Society
Forest History Society:Listing of the National Forests of the United States Text from Davis, Richard C., ed. Encyclopedia of American Forest and Conservation History. New York: Macmillan Publishing Company for the Forest History Society, 1983. Vol. II, pp. 743-788.

Former National Forests of New Mexico
Protected areas of Socorro County, New Mexico